The Gambia Football Federation (GFF), formerly known as the Gambia Football Association, is the governing body of football in Gambia. It was founded in 1952, and affiliated to FIFA in 1968 and to CAF in 1966. It organizes the GFA League First Division, the GFA League Second Division and the national team. The current president is Lamin Kaba Bajo since September 2014.

References

External links
 Gambia at the FIFA website.
  Gambia at CAF Online

Gambia
Football
Football in the Gambia
Sports organizations established in 1952